Danilo Napolitano (born 31 January 1981) is an Italian former professional road racing cyclist, who rode professionally between 2004 and 2017, and was chiefly known for his sprinting abilities.

Born in Vittoria, Sicily, Napolitano turned professional in 2004 and for the 2004 and 2005 seasons he rode for the professional continental team . For the 2006 season he moved on to the UCI ProTour squad  where his most important victories were two stage wins in the Tour of Austria, and a stage win in the Tour Méditerranéen. He joined  at the beginning of the 2009 season.

Major results

2002
 4th Circuito del Porto
 9th Trofeo Papà Cervi
2003
 1st Trofeo Papà Cervi
 1st Stage 1 Vuelta a Guatemala
 4th Circuito del Porto
2004
 1st Stage 6 Vuelta por un Chile Líder
 2nd Trofeo Papà Cervi
 2nd Circuito del Porto
2005
 1st Stausee-Rundfahrt Klingnau
 1st Coppa Bernocchi
 1st Giro della Romagna
 Tour du Poitou-Charentes et de la Vienne
1st Stages 2 & 5
 1st Stage 3 Settimana Internazionale di Coppi e Bartali
 1st Stage 3 Brixia Tour
 2nd Châteauroux Classic
 3rd Giro del Lago Maggiore
2006
 1st Coppa Bernocchi
 Settimana Internazionale di Coppi e Bartali
1st Stages 1a & 4
 Tour of Austria
1st Points classification
1st Stages 1 & 5
 1st Stage 1 Tour Méditerranéen
 1st Stage 3a Brixia Tour
 3rd Gran Premio della Costa Etruschi
 5th Milan–San Remo
 8th Paris–Tours
 9th Vattenfall Cyclassics
2007
 1st Coppa Bernocchi
 1st Gran Premio Città di Misano – Adriatico
 Tour de Pologne
1st Stages 1 (TTT) & 4
 1st Stage 9 Giro d'Italia
 1st Stage 5 Vuelta a Murcia
 1st Stage 1 Tour of Slovenia
 4th Vattenfall Cyclassics
 5th Clásica de Almería
2008
 Volta a Portugal
1st Stages 1 & 2
 1st Stage 5 Tour of Qatar
 1st Stage 3 Giro della Provincia di Grosseto
 1st Stage 5 Volta a la Comunitat Valenciana
 1st Stage 1a Brixia Tour
 3rd Gran Premio della Costa Etruschi
2009
 1st Stage 1 Vuelta a Andalucía
 1st Stage 2 Driedaagse van West-Vlaanderen
 1st Stage 1a Settimana Internazionale di Coppi e Bartali
 1st Stage 1 Tour de Luxembourg
 4th Overall Tour de Picardie
 4th Nationale Sluitingsprijs
 7th Overall Circuit Franco-Belge
2010
 1st Stage 2 Four Days of Dunkirk
 1st Stage 1 Tour de Wallonie
 6th Overall Tour of Qatar
2011
 2nd Gran Premio Nobili Rubinetterie
 3rd Overall Ronde van Drenthe
 6th Grand Prix de Denain
 9th Gran Premio della Costa Etruschi
2012
 Tour de Wallonie
1st Points classification
1st Stages 2, 4 & 5
 1st Stage 4 Circuit de Lorraine
 9th Gran Premio della Costa Etruschi
2013
 1st Stage 1 Driedaagse van West-Vlaanderen
 2nd Dutch Food Valley Classic
 8th Grand Prix de Denain
 8th Halle–Ingooigem
2014
 1st Omloop van het Waasland
 1st  Points classification Driedaagse van West-Vlaanderen
 3rd Gran Premio Industria e Commercio di Prato
 6th Handzame Classic
 7th Le Samyn
 7th Scheldeprijs
 7th Grand Prix Pino Cerami
2015
 1st Stage 3 Boucles de la Mayenne
 2nd Overall World Ports Classic
2016
 7th Gran Premio Bruno Beghelli
2017
 4th Dorpenomloop Rucphen
 6th Ronde van Drenthe

References

External links

 Profile at team website

1981 births
Living people
Italian male cyclists
Italian Giro d'Italia stage winners
People from Vittoria, Sicily
Sportspeople from the Province of Ragusa
Cyclists from Sicily